Tatiana Bodóvá (born 8 May 1991 in Levoča) is a Slovakian short track speed skater.

Bodóvá competed at the 2014 Winter Olympics for Slovakia. In the 1500 metres she was fifth in her heat, ending up 29th overall.

As of September 2014, Bodóvá's best performance at the World Championships came in 2014, when she finished 15th in the 500m.

As of September 2014, Bodóvá's top World Cup ranking is 37th, in the 1000 metres in 2011–12.

References

External links 
 
 
 

1991 births
Living people
Slovak female short track speed skaters
Olympic short track speed skaters of Slovakia
Short track speed skaters at the 2014 Winter Olympics
People from Levoča
Sportspeople from the Prešov Region